Vida Anim (born 7 December 1983 in Accra, Greater Accra) is a Ghanaian sprinter who specializes in the 100 and 200 metres. Together with Mavis Akoto, Monica Twum and Vida Nsiah she holds the Ghanaian record in 4 x 100 metres relay with 43.19 seconds, achieved during the heats at the 2000 Summer Olympics in Sydney.

Vida Anim represented Ghana at the 2008 Summer Olympics in Beijing competing at the 100 metres sprint. In her first round heat she placed second behind Shelly-Ann Fraser in a time of 11.47 to advance to the second round. There she improved her time to 11.32 seconds, finishing third behind Debbie Ferguson and Oludamola Osayomi. In the semi finals she was unable to qualify for the final as her time of 11.51 was only the eighth and last time of her heat, causing elimination.

Competition record

Personal bests
60 metres – 7.18 s (2004, indoor)
100 metres – 11.14 s (2004) – national record.
200 metres – 22.81 s (2006) – national record is 22.80 s.

References

External links 

 

1983 births
Living people
Ghanaian female sprinters
Athletes (track and field) at the 2000 Summer Olympics
Athletes (track and field) at the 2004 Summer Olympics
Athletes (track and field) at the 2008 Summer Olympics
Athletes (track and field) at the 2012 Summer Olympics
Olympic athletes of Ghana
Athletes (track and field) at the 2002 Commonwealth Games
Athletes (track and field) at the 2006 Commonwealth Games
Sportspeople from Accra
Commonwealth Games competitors for Ghana
African Games gold medalists for Ghana
African Games medalists in athletics (track and field)
African Games silver medalists for Ghana
African Games bronze medalists for Ghana
Athletes (track and field) at the 1999 All-Africa Games
Athletes (track and field) at the 2003 All-Africa Games
Athletes (track and field) at the 2007 All-Africa Games
Athletes (track and field) at the 2011 All-Africa Games
Olympic female sprinters